Cedar Grove Cemetery may refer to:

 Cedar Grove Cemetery (Franklin, Somerset County, New Jersey)
 Cedar Grove Cemetery (Chaumont, New York)
 Cedar Grove Cemetery (Queens), New York
 Cedar Grove Cemetery (New London, Connecticut)
 Cedar Grove Cemetery (New Bern, North Carolina)
 Cedar Grove Cemetery (Lebanon, Tennessee)
 Cedar Grove Cemetery (Portsmouth, Virginia)
 Cedar Grove Cemetery, one of two cemeteries on the campus of the University of Notre Dame in Indiana
 Cedar Grove Cemetery (Augusta, Georgia), where C. M. Battey is buried
 Cedar Grove Cemetery (Boston, Massachusetts), where John Conness is buried